Jeffrey 'Jeff' Allen Eldridge (born January 13, 1967 in Xenia, Ohio) is an American politician and a Democratic member of the West Virginia House of Delegates representing District 22 since January 12, 2013. Eldridge served non-consecutively from January 2005 until January 2011 in the District 19 seat.

Education
Eldridge earned his BA in education and other degrees from Marshall University.

Elections
2012 Redistricted to District 22 alongside Democratic incumbent Representative Josh Stowers, Eldridge ran in the six-way May 8, 2012 Democratic Primary and placed second with 2,348 votes (29.3%), and placed second in the four-way two-position November 6, 2012 General election with 5,262 votes (26.3%), behind Representative Stowers and ahead of Republican nominees Michel Moffatt and Gary Johngrass.
2002 Initially in District 19, Eldridge ran in the seven-way 2002 Democratic Primary but lost; the four frontrunners won the eight-way four-position November 5, 2002 General election.
2004 Eldridge placed in the ten-way 2004 Democratic Primary ahead of incumbent Representative Bill Wright; Eldridge and the other three incumbent won the eight-way four-position November 2, 2004 General election.
2006 Eldridge placed in the twelve-way 2006 Democratic Primary; the four frontrunners won the seven-way four-position November 7, 2006 General election.
2008 Eldridge ran in the twelve-way May 13, 2008 Democratic Primary, placing fourth with 5,194 votes (10.2%); they were unopposed in the four-position November 4, 2008 General election, where Eldridge placed third with 13,511 votes (23.5%).
2010 Eldridge challenged Senate District 7 appointed Democratic Senator Ron Stollings in the May 11, 2010 Democratic Primary, but lost to Senator Stollings, who was unopposed for the November 2, 2010 General election and was elected to the remainder of the term.

References

External links
Official page at the West Virginia Legislature

Jeff Eldridge at Ballotpedia
Jeff Eldridge at OpenSecrets

1967 births
Living people
Marshall University alumni
Democratic Party members of the West Virginia House of Delegates
People from Logan County, West Virginia
Politicians from Xenia, Ohio
21st-century American politicians
People from Alum Creek, West Virginia